The women's 4 × 200-metre freestyle relay event at the 2016 Summer Olympics took place on 10 August at the Olympic Aquatics Stadium.

Summary
The U.S. women's team overhauled the rest of the field on the home stretch to defend their Olympic title with the help of a sterling anchor leg from Katie Ledecky. Trading the lead with Sweden, China, and Australia through the first three legs of the race, Ledecky left the field behind with an anchor split of 1:53.74 to deliver the American foursome of Allison Schmitt (1:56.21), Leah Smith (1:56.69), and Maya DiRado (1:56.39) a gold medal in 7:43.03. As the Americans celebrated their victory, Ledecky also added the relay gold to her individual triumphs in both the 200 and 400 m freestyle earlier.

Australia's Leah Neale (1:57.95), Emma McKeon (1:54.64), and Bronte Barratt (1:55.81) moved themselves to the front on the third leg. As the youngster Tamsin Cook dove into the pool at the final exchange with a 1:56.47 split, she could not catch Ledecky near the wall to reproduce her nation's silver-medal feat from London 2012 in 7:44.87. Meanwhile, Canada's Katerine Savard (1:57.91), Taylor Ruck (1:56.18), Brittany MacLean (1:56.36), and Penny Oleksiak (1:54.94) were unable to close the gap on the two leading teams at the anchor leg, leaving them with a bronze and a national record in 7:45.39.

Seizing a brief lead early in the race, the Chinese combination of Shen Duo (1:56.30), Ai Yanhan (1:57.79), Dong Jie (1:57.15), and Zhang Yuhan (1:56.72) slipped out of medals to fourth in 7:47.96. Sweden's Michelle Coleman (1:56.20), Ida Marko-Varga (1:59.46), Sarah Sjöström (1:54.88), and Louise Hansson (1:59.72) finished the race with a fifth-place time in 7:50.26, while Hungary (7:51.03), anchored by three-time gold medalist Katinka Hosszú, Russia (7:53.26), and Japan (7:56.76) rounded out the championship field.

Records
Prior to this competition, the existing world and Olympic records were as follows.

Competition format

The competition consisted of two rounds: heats and a final. The relay teams with the best 8 times in the heats advanced to the final. Swim-offs were used as necessary to break ties for advancement to the next round.

Results

Heats
A total of sixteen countries qualified to participate. The best eight from two heats advanced to the final.

Final

References

Women's 4 x 200 metre freestyle relay
Olympics
2016 in women's swimming
Women's events at the 2016 Summer Olympics